The Maroa Municipality  is one of the seven municipalities (municipios) that makes up the southern Venezuelan state of Amazonas and, according to the 2011 census by the National Institute of Statistics of Venezuela, the municipality had a population of 2,029.  The town of Maroa is the shire town of the Maroa Municipality.

History
Maroa was founded by the brave Cacique Maruwa in the year 1760.

Demographics
The Maroa Municipality, according to a 2007 population estimate by the National Institute of Statistics of Venezuela, had a population of 1,900 (up from 1,706 in 2000). This amounted to 1.3% of the state's population.

Government
The mayor of the Maroa Municipality is Thaimir Briceño Angulo, elected on October 31, 2004, with 61% of the vote.  She replaced Antonio Briceño shortly after the elections.  The municipality is divided into two parishes; Victorino and Comunidad (previous to December 18, 1997, the Maroa Municipality contained only a single parish).

See also
Maroa, Amazonas
Amazonas
Municipalities of Venezuela

References

Municipalities of Amazonas (Venezuelan state)